The 2009 1000 km of Okayama was the inaugural event of Automobile Club de l'Ouest's (ACO) Asian Le Mans Series.  It was held at the Okayama International Circuit, Japan and feature two 500 km races held on 30 October and 1 November 2009.  The winning teams in each of the four categories earned an automatic invitation to the 2010 24 Hours of Le Mans.  A second Asian Le Mans Series event, scheduled for the Shanghai International Circuit, China, on 7 and 8 November was cancelled by the ACO due to economic circumstances.  The race weekend is being shared with the World Touring Car Championship's Race of Japan.

Entries
The ACO's initial plans for the debut event of the Asian Le Mans Series was for a minimum of 30 entries.  On 9 May 2009 the ACO announced an initial entry of 31 teams which would consist of competitors from the Le Mans Series, American Le Mans Series, FIA GT Championship, Super GT, as well as other local Japanese and Chinese teams.  The ACO agreed to supply applying teams with freight transport in an attempt to lure further entries.

A second entry list was published on 1 September and included 23 cars.  The final entry list is led by Europeans in the LMP1 category featuring Pescarolo Sport entered under the Sora Racing title, two Kolles Audis, an Le Mans Series-champion Aston Martin, one Oreca, and the new Drayson Lola.  The sole Japanese entrant in the category was from Tōkai University/YGK Power, who last competed at the 2007 24 Hours of Le Mans.  LMP2 features a mere two entries, both from the Le Mans Series.  OAK Racing enters their Mazda-powered Pescarolo while Ibañez Racing Service enters their Courage-AER for a shot at a Le Mans invitation.

Entries in the GT1 category were predominantly Japanese, all of which are teams currently entered in the Super GT series.  Hitotsuyama Team Nova's Aston Martin was joined by the experienced JLOC Lamborghinis.  The sole European entry was the Larbre Compétition Saleen.  In GT2 there were a variety of entries and cars, led by the first entries from the American Le Mans Series: Rahal Letterman Racing brought one of their new BMW M3s while Robertson Racing represents Ford.  Felbermayr-Proton's two Porsches and Team Farnbacher's Hankook-shod Ferrari were entered from the Le Mans Series, while Hankook-KTR, Team Daishin, and JimGainer came from Super GT.  Scuderia Forme also entered their Porsche 996 which had previously competed in the Japan Le Mans Challenge.  A lone Chinese entry came in the form of an Aston Martin for Team Hong Kong Racing.

The top two teams from the 2009 Formula Le Mans Cup series were to also receive free entries for the event, but a scheduling conflict with the new Formula Le Mans Winter Series prevented teams from participating.

Qualifying
Jonny Cocker led the field in the Drayson Lola-Judd, earning the first pole position for himself and the team.  A tenth of a second behind was Christophe Tinseau in the Sora Pescarolo 01, while Nicolas Lapierre was a further three tenths of a second behind for Oreca.  Mathieu Laheye was the victor amongst the two LMP2 cars, beating the Ibañez Courage by three seconds.

GT1 was led by the local Hitotsuyama Team Nova Aston Martin of Takeshi Tsuchiya, but the car was later disqualified for a rear wing violation.  This gave the Larbre Saleen pole position in the category, ahead of the two JLOC Lamborghinis.  A similar story in GT2 featured the Team Hong Kong Aston Martin initially setting the fastest time but later being disqualified for the same rule violation.  Marc Lieb's Felbermayr-Proton Porsche thus was promoted to pole position, leading the JimGainer Ferrari and the second Felbermayr-Proton entry.  The two disqualified Aston Martins will be required to start from the back of the grid.

Qualifying result
Pole position winners in each class are marked in bold.  The qualifying positions will set the starting grid for both races.

Race One

The first 500 km race was led early by Jonny Cocker in the Drayson Lola-Judd before Cocker was forced to pit for headlight repairs, dropping him several laps behind the leaders.  The Aston Martin Racing entry led for much of the three hours before being forced to make an extra pit stop for fuel in the closing minutes, allowing the Sora Pescarolo to win the first race of the weekend.  Drivers Christophe Tinseau and Shinji Nakano led the second place Oreca by a margin of 6.9 seconds at the finish, while the third place No. 15 Kolles Audi was two laps behind in third.  OAK Racing won the LMP2 category by 22 seconds over their only other competitor.

In the GT1 class it was the Japanese teams which dominated as JLOC's No. 69 Lamborghini won the category by fifteen seconds over the Hitotsuyama Team Nova Aston Martin.  The Larbre Saleen and second JLOC Lamborghini failed to finish the race.  GT2 was led by the American entry from Rahal Letterman BMW, finishing three tenths of a second ahead of European Felbermayr-Proton Porsche and Farnbacher Ferrari.

Race result
Class winners in bold. Cars failing to complete 70% of winner's distance are marked as Not Classified (NC).

Race Two
The second race started with the same grid as the first race, which allowed Jonny Cocker to once again lead the opening laps in Drayson Lola.  Stefan Mücke in the Aston Martin was able to catch Cocker and take the lead several laps in, which it maintained for the rest of the event and took the second of the weekend's checkered flags.  Race one winners Sora Racing finished in second but over a minute behind the Aston Martin.  Oreca once again finished on the podium with third.  In LMP2, early damage to the Ibañez Courage allowed OAK Racing to win the second race unchallenged.

In the GT1 category the class was again dominated by the Hitotsuyama Aston Martin and the No. 68 JLOC Lamborghini, although it was Hitotsuyama who were the victors in this round, winning by over a lap.  The Larbre Compétition Saleen was third in class, just losing out to the Lamborghini by less than two tenths of a second.  In the GT2 category the race one-winning No. 77 Felbermayr-Proton Porsche suffered an engine failure early in the event, allowing the second team car and the Robertson Ford to fight for the class lead.  Engine problems set the Ford back but Felbermayr-Proton were still not able to secure victory as the Hankook Farnbacher Ferrari was able to make it into the top position at the end of the three hours.  The Japanese Team Daishin Ferrari completed the podium in third.

Race result
Class winners in bold. Cars failing to complete 70% of winner's distance are marked as Not Classified (NC).

References

External links

 Asian Le Mans Series

Okayama
1000 km of Okayama 2009
1000 km of Okayama 2009